Croatia sent a delegation to compete at the 2010 Winter Paralympics in Vancouver. A total of four athletes (three men and a woman) competed, all in alpine skiing.

Alpine skiing 

Women

Men

See also
Croatia at the 2010 Winter Olympics
Croatia at the Paralympics

References

External links
Vancouver 2010 Paralympic Games official website
International Paralympic Committee official website

Nations at the 2010 Winter Paralympics
2010
Paralympics